In Plain Sight is a 2008 American drama television series about US Marshals.

In Plain Sight may also refer to:

 In Plain Sight (British TV series), 2016 British drama series about serial killer Peter Manuel
 In Plain Sight (nonfiction book), 2018 true-crime book by Kathryn Casey
 In Plain Sight (Jackson book), 2016 book by Richard Jackson
 "In Plain Sight" (Supergirl), an episode of Supergirl

See also